"The Touch" is the second single from the 1984 Kim Wilde album Teases & Dares, released at the end of the year it did not match the success of her previous single. 

It was released as both a 7" and a 12" single. The 7" had a remix of the album version on side A, and a track written by Wilde herself on side B entitled "Shangri-La", also from the Teases and Dares album. Both tracks were extended for the 12" release. It also featured in the soundtrack of the American movie Secret Admirer.

The music video for "The Touch" features Wilde playing Cinderella.

Charts

References

External links

Kim Wilde songs
1984 songs
Songs written by Marty Wilde
Songs written by Ricky Wilde
MCA Records singles